Tomando Control: Live (English: Taking Control) is a live album by Puerto Rican duo Wisin & Yandel. It was released on September 25, 2007. It is based on their March 17, 2007, concert at Coliseo de Puerto Rico José Miguel Agrelot in San Juan, Puerto Rico.

Track listing

Chart performance

See also
List of number-one Billboard Latin Rhythm Albums of 2007

References

Wisin & Yandel live albums
2007 live albums